Lions is a pair of outdoor 1893 bronze sculptures by Edward Kemeys, installed outside the Art Institute of Chicago, in the U.S. state of Illinois.

Description
The sculptures are modeled after African lions. Each sculpture weighs more than two tons.

The sculptures stand outside of the Art Institute of Chicago Building. Kemeys described the statues as, "conceived as guarding the building". The artist, Edward Kemeys, described the northern lion as positioned, "on the prowl", and said that it, "has his back up, and is ready for a roar and a spring". He described the southern lion as positioned, "in an attitude of defiance", and that it is "attracted by something in the distance which he is closely watching". Kemeys referred to the design of the southern sculpture as, "the most difficult I have ever attempted".

The bronze sculptures have a green patina.

History
Kemeys' Lions for the Art Institute of Chicago often are described as being bronze re-castings of temporary plaster lion sculptures that were displayed on the grounds of the 1893 World's Columbian Exposition, flanking the Palace of Fine Arts (today's Museum of Science and Industry building). However, documents and photographs from the World's Fair support the lions displayed at the World's Columbian Exposition having been instead created by A. Phimister Proctor and Theodore Baur, not Kemeys. The bronze sculptures for the Art Institute of Chicago were commissioned by Florence Lathrop Field, an early benefactor of the museum. Fields' late husband Henry Field had been an admirer of Kemeys' sculptures, and her brother Bryan Lathrop, a trustee of the Art Institute, had been a patron of Kemeys.

After the board of trustees of the Art Institute of Chicago had made a decision for there to be guardian lion sculptures outside of the new museum building, the president of the board of trustees, Charles L. Hutchinson, favored commissioning such as work from one of a dozen better-known sculptors. Those considered included Augustus Bauer, Daniel Chester French, Frederick William Macmonnies, Philip Martiny, and Augustus Saint-Gaudens. Bryan Lathrop wrote him in September of 1892, strongly recommending he choose Kemeys. Lathrop proposed having his sister, Florence Lathrop Field, acquire and  gift the Art Institute such sculptures. Lathrop stated that Field had wanted to donate them anonymously. However, in voting to accept the gift on January 31, 1893, the board of trustee's executive committee also voted to thank the donor.

The sculptures were cast in Chicago by the American Bronze Founding Company in 1893, and were unveiled on May 10, 1894.

The Chicago Lions rugby union team, founded in 1964, is named for the statues.

The lions are occasionally decorated. The lions are, nowadays, decorated in the winter holiday season with wreaths and bows in an annual "wreathing of the lions" ceremony. Often, when a Chicago major league sports team is making a strong postseason run, the sculptures will be adorned to show support for the team.

In 2018, as part of the public art exhibit Statue Stories of Chicago, QR codes were installed near each statues that, if scanned, would allow the lions to "speak". One was voiced by Mandy Patinkin, and the other by Tracy Letts.

See also

 1893 in art
 1894 in art
 Cultural depictions of lions

References

External links
 

1893 sculptures
1894 establishments in Illinois
Animal sculptures in the United States
Bronze sculptures in Illinois
Outdoor sculptures in Chicago
Sculptures of lions
Statues in Illinois
Sculptures of the Art Institute of Chicago